SERTA domain-containing protein 1 is a protein that in humans is encoded by the SERTAD1 gene.

Interactions 

SERTAD1 has been shown to interact with:
 CREB-binding protein,
 Cyclin-dependent kinase 4, and
 P16.

References

Further reading